The Ripcord World Tour (stylized as the ripCORD World Tour) was the tenth headlining concert tour by New Zealand-born Australian country music singer Keith Urban, in support of his ninth studio album Ripcord (2016). The tour began on 2 June 2016 in Bonner Springs, Kansas and concluded on 17 December 2016 with two shows in Brisbane, Australia. Brett Eldredge, Maren Morris, and Dallas Smith all served as supporting acts for Urban in North America. The Oceania leg of the tour was co-headlined with American singer Carrie Underwood, with Buchanan as opening act.

Background
The tour was first announced in January 2016. About the tour, Urban said that new music from RipCORD would be played, there would be new production, and that he would be playing in cities he'd never been to before. Australian dates were announced in April 2016.

Opening acts
Maren Morris  
Brett Eldredge  
Dallas Smith 
Buchanan

Setlists
{{hidden
| headercss = background: #FFFF00; font-size: 100%; width: 59%;
| contentcss = text-align: left; font-size: 100%; width: 75%;
| header = North America
| content = 
This set list was obtained from the 2 June 2016 concert in Bonner Springs, Kansas. It does not represent all concerts during the tour.

"Gone Tomorrow (Here Today)"
"Long Hot Summer"
"Break on Me"
"Where the Blacktop Ends"
"Somewhere in My Car"
"Everybody"
"Blue Ain't Your Color"
"Gettin' in the Way"
"Days Go By"
"We Were Us" 
"Cop Car"
"The Fighter"
"You Gonna Fly"
"You Look Good in My Shirt"
"Somebody Like You"
"That Could Still Be Us"
"Little Bit of Everything"
"Sun Don’t Let Me Down"
"Wasted Time"
"John Cougar, John Deere, John 3:16"
"But for the Grace of God"
Encore
"Stupid Boy"
"Raise 'Em Up"

}}
{{hidden
| headercss = background: #FFFF00; font-size: 100%; width: 59%;
| contentcss = text-align: left; font-size: 100%; width: 75%;
| header = Oceania
| content =

"Gone Tomorrow (Here Today)"
"Long Hot Summer"
"Break on Me"
"Where the Blacktop Ends"
"Somewhere in My Car"
"Worry 'Bout Nothin'"
"Blue Ain't Your Color"
"Days Go By"
"We Were Us"
"Cop Car"
"Sweet Thing"
"Unintended"
"One Call Away" 
"Sun Don't Let Me Down"
"The Fighter" / "Stop Draggin' My Heart Around"
"You Look Good in My Shirt"
"Somebody Like You"
"Who Wouldn't Wanna Be Me"
"Little Bit of Everything"
"John Cougar, John Deere, John 3:16" / "Jack & Diane" / "No Woman, No Cry" 
"Wasted Time"
Encore
"Making Memories of Us" 
"Stupid Boy"
"Raise 'Em Up"

}}
{{hidden
| headercss = background: #FFFF00; font-size: 100%; width: 59%;
| contentcss = text-align: left; font-size: 100%; width: 75%;
| header = Carrie Underwood set list
| content = Carrie Underwood co-headlined with Urban during shows in Oceania.

"Good Girl"
"Undo It"
"Church Bells"
"Wasted"
"Jesus, Take the Wheel"
"Blown Away"
"Cowboy Casanova"
"Dirty Laundry"
"Last Name"
"I Will Always Love You" 
"Flat on the Floor"
"Smoke Break"
"Before He Cheats"
"Something in the Water"
Encore
"The Fighter" 
"Stop Draggin' My Heart Around" 
}}

Tour dates

Festivals and other miscellaneous performances

Cancellations and rescheduled shows

External links
Keith Urban Official Website

References

2016 concert tours
Carrie Underwood concert tours
Keith Urban concert tours